Hinckley Rugby Club is an English rugby union team based in Hinckley, Leicestershire. The club runs six senior sides, a ladies team and a full set of junior teams. The first XV currently play in National League 2 West, a fourth tier league in the English rugby union system.

History
Hinckley Rugby Club was formed in 1892 with the first matches being played the following year. As with many clubs, Hinckley moved regularly during the early years of the 20th-century before moving to Coventry Road in 1929 and to its current Leicester Road location just under forty years later. After a strong 1970s, the 1980s were unkind to Hinckley and when the league system was formed the club suffered three consecutive relegations. However, fortunes improved in the 1990s and they started to move back up the rugby hierarchy and reached the National leagues by the end of the 1990s.

Honours
 Leicestershire County Cup winners (8): 1971–72, 1972–73, 1976–77, 1978–79, 1981–82, 1997–98, 2006–07, 2012–13
 Leicestershire 1 champions: 1990–91
 East Midlands/Leicestershire 1 champions: 1991–92
 Midlands East 1 champions: 1993–94
 Midlands 1 champions: 1996–97
 Midlands Division 2 East champions: 2001–02
 Midlands 2 (east v west) promotion play-off winner: 2007–08
 National League 3 (north v midlands) promotion play-off winner: 2015–16

Current standings

References

External links
 Official club website

English rugby union teams
1892 establishments in England
Rugby clubs established in 1892
Rugby union clubs in Leicestershire
Hinckley